Turn Coat is the 11th book in The Dresden Files, Jim Butcher's continuing series about wizard detective Harry Dresden. It debuted at number one on the New York Times Best Seller list for hardcover fiction.

Plot summary
Nearly a year and a half after the events in Small Favor, a wounded Warden Morgan shows up at Dresden's apartment, asking for protection from the other Wardens. Morgan reveals that he was drugged and framed for the murder of Senior Council member LaFortier. While obtaining medical supplies, Dresden spots a naagloshi, a shape-shifting creature from Native American lore. Over the course of investigating Morgan's apparent crime, he legally entangles his apprentice Molly, as well as Captain Luccio, after they stumble over Morgan in Dresden's home. Dresden also confronts Madeline Raith of the White Court, whom Dresden comes to suspect is behind framing Morgan, and Binder, a practitioner who uses beings of the Nevernever as a mercenary.

Dresden invites Captain Luccio to accompany him on a visit to Lara Raith and accuses her of complicity, but is interrupted by the naagloshi who ransoms Thomas Raith for Morgan. Realizing he needs far more strength to combat the naagloshi, Dresden performs a Sanctum Invocation and bonds with the spirit of Demonreach, the island in the finale of Small Favor. Despite this, Dresden—aware that he can't fight both the naagloshi and Morgan's betrayer alone—calls the Council, House Raith, and the naagloshii, convincing each that Morgan is on the island or that the island is where they will meet to discuss further strategy. Dresden manages to take down Madeline and Binder, but it takes the intervention of Listens-to-Wind to defeat the naagloshi. Thomas is rescued but is insane with hunger, and is collected by Lara. Morgan surrenders after the true murderer manages to slip away.

Back in Scotland for Morgan's trial, Dresden produces incontrovertible evidence that a high ranking clerk, Peabody, is the murderer, and has also been influencing virtually everyone on the Council by use of magically poisoned ink. Peabody escapes, slaughtering a large portion of the Council, and opens a Way into the Nevernever. Dresden chases Peabody down, but is overpowered. Morgan kills Peabody, but is mortally wounded. Morgan then explains that it was Anastasia Luccio who actually killed LaFortier, under the influence of Peabody, and Morgan acted to protect her. Morgan then passes away.

In the aftermath, Gregori Cristos (suspected by Dresden of being on the Black Council) fills LaFortier's Senior Council seat. During a respite, Luccio approaches Dresden, and confirms that her romantic feelings for Dresden were most likely manufactured by Peabody's subtle influences (as Rashid the Gatekeeper had suggested to Dresden while he was recovering in the Council Infirmary), and formally ends the relationship. Dresden learns that Ebenezar is slowly and quietly drumming up support from those who secretly believe that a Black Council exists, and that it must be opposed. Dresden labels the new group Ebenezar is forming as the "Grey Council".

Introduced characters

 Skinwalker: a Naagloshii, a Native American spirit of immense power and ability to change form. This creature has survived a millennium and is semi-divine in nature. It eats magical creatures, including wizards, to increase its own power.
 Vincent Graver: a private detective and former vice officer from Joliet, who resigned after being assigned to the SIU as punishment for trying to prosecute a Chicago city council member. Dresden is impressed with his integrity, and subcontracts detective work to him. By the end of the book, Graver and Molly have a date, and Graver and Mouse together bring in conclusive evidence implicating Samuel Peabody as the traitor within the White Council.
 Binder: Ernest Armand Tinwhistle, a Cockney mercenary who specializes in summoning a large number of creatures from the Nevernever.
 Chandler: a British Warden who guards the Nevernever portal to the White Council's headquarters in Edinburgh.
 Demonreach: the ancient spirit, genius loci, of the uncharted island in Lake Michigan. Dresden bonded with the spirit during the Sanctum Invocation. Whenever Dresden is physically present on the island, he shares the Demonreach's supernatural knowledge of the island. Demonreach appears as a  cloaked and robed figure with no visible features but glowing green eyes. It has a limp from "the glacier that carved out Lake Michigan" The island holds an unknown grudge against the Gatekeeper resulting in the Gatekeeper's unwillingness to step onto the island.
 Madeline Raith: a White Court vampire and cousin of Thomas and Lara. She betrayed the White Court to the Black Council in much the same way as Vitto Malvora did in White Night. Working with Lara's business manager, she creates a money trail from Morgan to one of Lara's holding companies, in order to implicate the White Court in LaFortier's death. She hires Binder to find Morgan before anyone else does, so that Morgan can be blamed for her future activities. Lara ultimately kills both Madeline and the business manager and sends their heads to the White Council.

References

External links

 The first five chapters of the book are found on the author's .

2009 American novels
American fantasy novels
Novels by Jim Butcher
The Dresden Files
Low fantasy novels
Urban fantasy novels
Roc Books books